Salininema is a Gram-positive and halophilic species of bacteria from the family of Glycomycetaceae.

References

Actinomycetia
Bacteria described in 2015
Monotypic bacteria genera